The Jones School is a historic school building at Linwood and Hobson Avenues in Hot Springs, Arkansas.  It is a three-story masonry structure, finished in red and beige brick, with concrete trim elements.  The building is an eclectic blend of Classical Revival and American craftsman styling, with Craftsman style window groupings and a Classical entrance portico.  It was built in 1913, and now houses the Hot Springs School District administrative offices.

The building was listed on the National Register of Historic Places in 1988.

See also
National Register of Historic Places listings in Garland County, Arkansas

References

School buildings on the National Register of Historic Places in Arkansas
Neoclassical architecture in Arkansas
School buildings completed in 1913
Buildings and structures in Hot Springs, Arkansas
National Register of Historic Places in Hot Springs, Arkansas
1913 establishments in Arkansas